Acrolepis (Ancient Greek for "tip scale") is an extinct genus of prehistoric bony fish that lived from the Tournaisian stage of the Mississippian (early Carboniferous) to the late Permian epoch. Some species from the Early Triassic of Tasmania are also ascribed to Acrolepis.

It is a large piscivorous predatory fish in the acrolepid family, which occupy an apex predator niche in its locale.

A close relationship between the mostly Palaeozoic Acrolepidae and the Mesozoic Ptycholepiformes was proposed, but support from phylogenetic analyses is scarce.

Diet
Acrolepis possibly used its sharp, pointed teeth to catch small fish (most primarily Palaeonisciformes).

Fossil record
The type species is Acrolepis sedgwicki from the late Permian Marl Slate of England and the coeval Kupferschiefer of Germany. Other species are known from Carboniferous and Permian rocks in the Czech Republic and Triassic layers of Tasmania.

Specimens in possession of Tyne & Wear Archives and Museums comprise a fossilized jawbone from the Marl Slate of Durham Province.

Synonyms 
 Acrolepis arctica Woodward, 1912 → Boreosomus acticus
 Acrolepis digitata Woodward, 1891 → Namaichthys digitata
 Acrolepis laetus Lambe, 1916 → Pteronisculus? laetus

Other
The flag and  coat of arms of the village and municipality of Žilov, Plzeň-North District in the Plzeň Region of the Czech Republic, feature a restoration of Acrolepis gigas in the center of the black-silver-red divided fabric or shield, respectively.

See also

 Prehistoric fish
 List of prehistoric bony fish

References

Mississippian fish
Palaeonisciformes
Prehistoric ray-finned fish genera
Permian bony fish
Triassic fish
Triassic bony fish
Fossils of Germany